Karol and Antoni Szafranek Secondary and Tertiary State School of Music, pol. Państwowa Szkoła Muzyczna I i II stopnia im. Karola i Antoniego Szafranków is a specialist music school located in Rybnik, Silesian Voivodship, Poland. The school was founded in 1933 by brothers Karol and Antoni Szafranek, eminent musicians, alumni of conservatories in Germany, France and Poland.

Education

The school, as is typical of state music schools in Poland, trains children and adolescents on two levels: 
primary course, usually lasting six years,
secondary course, lasting also six years and finishing with obtaining an Artist Diploma in Performance.
Graduates of the school may enter music universities.

Areas of study 

 Principal instruments: piano, violin, viola, cello, double bass, accordion, guitar, flute, oboe, clarinet, saxophone, trombone, French horn, trumpet, bassoon, pipe organ
Additional musical subjects: ear training, history of music, music literature, music analysis, harmony and counterpoint, accompaniment, chamber music, choir, music in liturgy, orchestra and big-band

Notable alumni 
composer Henryk Mikołaj Górecki
pianist Piotr Paleczny
pianist Lidia Grychtołówna
jazz pianist Adam Makowicz

References

Rybnik
Educational institutions established in 1933
Rybnik
1933 establishments in Poland
Arts organizations established in 1933